The following is a timeline of the presidency of Barack Obama, from January 1, 2016 to January 20, 2017. For his time as president-elect, see the presidential transition of Barack Obama; for a detailed account of his first months in office, see first 100 days of Barack Obama's presidency; for a complete itinerary of his travels, see list of presidential trips made by Barack Obama.

January 2016
 January 5 – President Obama announces an executive order on gun control that would require purchased guns to undergo background checks.
 January 7 – President Obama participates in a town hall meeting regarding gun control entitled Guns in America at the George Mason University in Fairfax, Virginia, organized by CNN and moderated by Anderson Cooper.
 January 12 – President Obama delivers his final State of the Union Address before a joint session of Congress.
 January 15 – President Obama holds a live interview with YouTube personalities Adande Thorne, Destin Sandlin and Ingrid Nilsen.
 January 16 – President Obama signs an executive order lifting some of the economic sanctions on Iran.
 January 17 – President Obama delivers a statement on the Iran nuclear deal framework and the release of four Iranian-American prisoners from Iran through prisoner exchange.
 January 19 − President Obama holds a bilateral meeting with Prime Minister Malcolm Turnbull of Australia discussing the military intervention against ISIL.
 January 20 – President Obama visits Detroit's auto show.
 January 27 – President Obama meets with Democratic presidential candidate Bernie Sanders in the Oval Office.

February
 February 3 – President Obama visits the Islamic society at a mosque in Baltimore, marking his first visit to a mosque in the United States.
 February 4 − President Obama holds a bilateral meeting and a press conference with President Juan Manuel Santos of Colombia, where Obama announced a $450 million plan to fund Plan Colombia.
 February 4 − President Obama honors the 2015 NBA champion, the Golden State Warriors, at the East Room of the White House.
 February 8 − President Obama holds a bilateral meeting with President Sergio Mattarella of Italy.
 February 9 – President Obama releases his final budget proposal for the fiscal year 2017.
 February 10 – President Obama addresses the Illinois General Assembly in the State Capital Building in Springfield, Il and spoke about political gridlock.
 February 13 – President Obama issues a statement on the passing of Supreme court Justice Antonin Scalia
 February 15–16 – President Obama hosts the first special U.S.-ASEAN Leaders Summit, participating with the leaders of the Association of Southeast Asian Nations at the Sunnylands estate in Rancho Mirage, California.
 February 18 – President Obama welcomes the Stanley Cup winning Chicago Blackhawks to the White House.
 February 23 – President Obama unveils his plan to close the Guantanamo Bay detention camp in Caimanera, Cuba.
 February 24 − President Obama holds a bilateral meeting with King Abdullah of Jordan to discuss ISIS, the Syrian war and refugees and the reducing of tensions in the Middle East.
 February 24 – President Obama signs H.R. 1428 – Judicial Redress Act of 2015 and H.R. 644 – Trade Facilitation and Trade Enforcement Act of 2015 into law.
 February 29 − President Obama awards a Medal of Honor to SEAL Team Six member Edward Byers for rescuing an American doctor from the Taliban in Afghanistan in December 2012.

March

 March 10 – The President welcomes Canadian Prime Minister Justin Trudeau to the White House for a state visit.
 March 10 – The Obamas host a state dinner at the White House for Canadian Prime Minister Justin Trudeau.
 March 15 – President Obama holds a bilateral meeting with Taoiseach of Ireland, Enda Kenny.
 March 16 – President Obama announces Merrick Garland as his nomination to replace the late Antonin Scalia as an Associate Justice of the U.S. Supreme Court.
 March 20 – The President and the First Family travel to Havana, Cuba, to underscore the thaw in Cuba–United States relations following a 54-year rift; Obama is the first sitting U.S. president to visit the country since Calvin Coolidge in 1928.
 March 21 – President Obama holds a bilateral meeting and a joint press conference with President Raúl Castro of Cuba at the Palace of the Revolution in Havana.
 March 22 – President Obama addresses the Cuban people on national television from the Gran Teatro de La Habana in Havana, where he also delivered a statement on the Brussels bombings.
 March 22 – The Obamas and President Castro attend an exhibition baseball game between the Tampa Bay Rays and the Cuba national baseball team at Havana's Estadio Latinoamericano to highlight the two countries' cultural relations. The Rays won the game 4–1.
 March 23 – President Obama holds a bilateral meeting and a joint press conference with President Mauricio Macri of Argentina at Casa Rosada during a visit to Buenos Aires to discuss improving Argentina–United States relations, following tension in trade and investment between the two countries under Néstor and Cristina Fernández de Kirchner's administrations.
 March 31 – President Obama hosts the 2016 Nuclear Security Summit at the Walter E. Washington Convention Center in Washington, D.C., participating with 58 leaders and representatives from around the world to lay out a system of global security against nuclear warfare.
 March 31 – On the sidelines of the Nuclear Security Summit, President Obama holds a trilateral meeting with Prime Minister Shinzō Abe of Japan and President Park Geun-hye of South Korea to discuss trilateral cooperation amid North Korea's nuclear program.
 March 31 – President Obama holds a bilateral meeting with President Xi Jinping of China to discuss "global nuclear security cooperation" amid North Korea's nuclear program, as well as "constructive" cooperation regarding the territorial disputes in the South China Sea.

April

 April 4 – President Obama meets with NATO Secretary General Anders Fogh Rasmussen to discuss the alliance's involvement in the military intervention against ISIL (particularly in Libya) and the War in Afghanistan, as well as the Syrian refugee crisis.
 April 14 - President Obama and Vice President Biden meet with Prime Minister of Albania Edi Rama in the Oval Office.
 April 20 – President Obama holds a bilateral meeting with King Salman of Saudi Arabia in Riyadh to discuss joint action against the nuclear program of Iran and the Islamic State of Iraq and the Levant, the Syrian and Yemeni crises, as well as to resolve the issue of human rights.
 April 21 – President Obama participates in a summit meeting with the leaders of the Gulf Cooperation Council in Riyadh to discuss ways of addressing the Islamic State of Iraq and the Levant and other regional conflicts, including the Syrian and Yemeni crises.
 April 22 – The President and the First Lady attend a private lunch with Queen Elizabeth II and Prince Philip, Duke of Edinburgh at Windsor Castle in England to celebrate the Queen's 90th birthday.
 April 22 – President Obama participates in a joint press conference with British Prime Minister David Cameron at 10 Downing Street in London, reiterating their campaign for British voters to vote for the United Kingdom to remain in the European Union ahead of the referendum on June 23.
 April 22 – The President and the First Lady attend a dinner hosted by Prince William, Duke of Cambridge, Catherine, Duchess of Cambridge, and Prince Harry at Kensington Palace in London, where they also greet Prince George of Cambridge.
 April 23 – President Obama participates in a town hall meeting with the British youth at Lindley Hall in London, where he addressed questions regarding political issues like terrorism, trade, and the Northern Ireland peace process, as well as social issues and changes involving LGBT rights, racial inequality (touching on the Black Lives Matter movement), and discrimination towards non-binary gender persons.
 April 24 – During a joint press conference with German Chancellor Angela Merkel in Hanover, Germany, President Obama announces plans to increase U.S. military presence in Syria to at least 250 personnel to combat the Islamic State of Iraq and the Levant and assist local Syrian forces in doing so.
 April 25 – President Obama becomes the first sitting U.S. president to visit the Hannover Messe, the world's largest industrial fair, which he opened as the U.S. was the "partner country" of the fair.
 April 25 – President Obama and Chancellor Merkel participate in a multilateral meeting with other European leaders including British Prime Minister David Cameron, French President François Hollande, and Italian Prime Minister Matteo Renzi to discuss cooperation in resolving the Syrian and Libyan civil wars and the Russo-Ukrainian War.
 April 30 – President Obama attends his last White House Correspondents' Dinner.

May
 May 4 – President Obama visits Flint, Michigan to address the city's water crisis.
 May 7 – President Obama delivers a commencement speech to the 2016 graduating batch of Howard University, urging them to change their country "through action."
 May 13 – President Obama hosts a multilateral meeting and state dinner at the State Dining Room of the White House for the leaders of the five Nordic countries: Prime Minister Lars Løkke Rasmussen of Denmark, President Sauli Niinistö of Finland, President Ólafur Ragnar Grímsson of Iceland, Prime Minister Erna Solberg of Norway, and Prime Minister Stefan Löfven of Sweden. The six leaders discussed humanitarian issues, combating climate change, and the Russo-Ukrainian War.
 May 15 – President Obama delivers a commencement speech entitled Ignorance is not a Virtue at Rutgers University's 250th anniversary commencement ceremony in New Brunswick, New Jersey.
 May 22 – President Obama arrives in Hanoi for a three-day visit to Vietnam aimed at building stronger economic and defense ties with the country and the Asia-Pacific region.
 May 23 – President Obama announces the full lifting of the 32-year arms embargo on Vietnam.
 May 25 – President Obama attends the 42nd G7 summit in Shima, Japan.
 May 26 – President Obama and Japanese Prime Minister Shinzō Abe visit one of Japan's holiest Shinto sites, the Ise Grand Shrine and plant trees.
 May 27 – President Obama becomes the first sitting U.S. president to visit the city of Hiroshima following the atomic bombings of Hiroshima and Nagasaki, where he pays his respects along with Prime Minister Abe and meets with survivors at the Hiroshima Peace Memorial Park, calling for the end of nuclear weapons.

June

 June 2 − President Obama delivers a commencement speech to the graduating class of the United States Air Force Academy in Colorado, urging them to reject an "isolationist foreign policy."
 June 7 − President Obama holds a bilateral meeting with Prime Minister Narendra Modi of India.
 June 9 – President Obama meets with Vermont Senator Bernie Sanders and soon after endorses former Secretary of State Hillary Clinton for the presidency in the 2016 election.
 June 16 – President Obama travels to Orlando, Florida to meet with survivors and families of those victimized by the Orlando nightclub shooting, the second-deadliest mass shooting in U.S. history, which occurred four days prior.
 June 17–19 – The Obamas visit the Carlsbad Caverns National Park in New Mexico and Yosemite National Park in California's Sierra Nevada mountains to highlight natural conservation, which coincides with the centennial celebrations of the National Park Service.
 June 24 – President Obama announces that the Stonewall Inn in New York City will be designated as the first National Monument dedicated to the LGBT history in the United States.
 June 24 – While delivering his speech at the Global Entrepreneurship Summit 2016 at Stanford University in Palo Alto, California, President Obama comments on the United Kingdom's decision to withdraw from the European Union following the result of their nationwide referendum held on June 23, saying that the Special Relationship between the U.S. and the UK is "enduring", UK's membership in NATO is "a vital cornerstone of U.S. foreign, security, and economic policy", and the U.S.' relationship with both the UK and the EU will "remain indispensable".
 June 29 – President Obama participates in the North American Leaders' Summit in Ottawa, Ontario, Canada with Prime Minister Justin Trudeau of Canada and President Enrique Peña Nieto of Mexico.
 June 29 – President Obama addresses the Parliament of Canada in Ottawa to commit to Canada–United States relations.
June 30 — President Obama signs the Puerto Rico Oversight, Management, and Economic Stability Act (PROMESA).

July
 July 7–9 – President Obama participates in the 2016 NATO summit in Warsaw, Poland that focuses on strengthening defense cooperation to protect Eastern Europe from Russian aggression on Ukraine, confronting the Islamic State in Iraq and Syria, the European migrant crisis, and the United Kingdom withdrawal from the European Union. He also announces that around 1,000 extra troops will be deployed to Poland to bolster NATO's eastern flank.
 July 7 – In Warsaw, President Obama comments on the American public reaction to the shooting of Alton Sterling in Baton Rouge, Louisiana and the shooting of Philando Castile in Minnesota, cases which have led to protests in the United States and allegations of racial injustice and profiling by police.
 July 8 – In Warsaw, President Obama comments on the shooting of Dallas police officers in the aftermath of the fatal shootings of Sterling and Castile, the deadliest single incident in the history of U.S. law enforcement since the September 11, 2001 attacks He calls the event "a vicious, calculated and despicable attack on law enforcement," and orders all U.S. flags to be flown in half-staff for five days in honor of the five victims.
 July 22 – President Obama holds a bilateral meeting and a press conference with President Enrique Peña Nieto of Mexico.
 July 27 – President Obama is a keynote speaker at the Democratic National Convention in Philadelphia.

August
 August 2 – The President welcomes Singaporean Prime Minister Lee Hsien Loong to the White House for a state visit; the Obamas host a state dinner at the White House for Singaporean Prime Minister Lee Hsien Loong.
 August 6 – President Obama begins his vacation of the island of Martha's Vineyard for the 6th and final time during his presidency.
 August 21 – President Obama and his family return to the White House after a 16-day vacation on the island of Martha's Vineyard off the coast of Massachusetts.
 August 23 – President Obama visits Baton Rouge to survey the damage and to comfort the victims of flood destruction in 20 Louisiana parishes.
 August 31 – President Obama leaves on his final trip to Asia as President. He visits Midway Atoll, China and Laos.

September
 September 4 − President Obama participates in the 2016 G-20 Hangzhou summit in Hangzhou, China.
 September 6 − President Obama participates in the Eleventh East Asia Summit in Vientiane, Laos.
 September 19 – President Obama holds a bilateral meeting with Premier Li Keqiang of China.
 September 19 – President Obama holds a bilateral meeting with Prime Minister Malcolm Turnbull of Australia.
 September 20 – President Obama addresses the United Nations General Assembly.
 September 24 – President Obama dedicates the new Smithsonian National Museum of African American History and Culture on the National Mall in Washington D.C.
 September 28 – President Obama experiences the first veto override of his administration. In a bipartisan vote, both houses of Congress override Obama's veto of the Justice Against Sponsors of Terrorism Act. The legislation allows families of the victims of the September 11 attacks to sue Saudi Arabia for its alleged role in the attacks.
 September 30 – President Obama gave a eulogy at the funeral for former Israeli President and Prime Minister Shimon Peres.

October
 October 18 – The President welcomes Italian Prime Minister Matteo Renzi to the White House for a state visit.
 October 18 – The Obamas host a state dinner at the White House for Italian Prime Minister Matteo Renzi.

November

 November 8 – The 2016 United States presidential election takes place. Republican Party nominee Donald Trump becomes president-elect after he had secured the projected total to 279 electoral votes by winning Pennsylvania (20 electoral votes) and Wisconsin (10 electoral votes), which he had reached over the required electoral votes of 270 to clinch victory. Democratic Party nominee Hillary Clinton concedes defeat and congratulates Trump on his victory.
 November 8 – The Republican Party narrowly retains majorities in the House of Representatives and the Senate after suffering important election losses.
 November 9 – President Obama calls President-elect Donald Trump in the early morning hours to congratulate him on his victory. 
 November 10 – President Obama meets with President-elect Donald Trump at the Oval Office to discuss the transition of power between the presidents. President Obama states the meeting was "excellent," and President-elect Trump says the meeting was supposed to last around 10–15 minutes, but went on to be around 90 minutes.
 November 14 – President Obama holds his first news conference since the election of Donald Trump and encourages Americans to give him some time to get adjusted to the responsibilities of the position as President.
 November 15 – President Obama travels to Athens, Greece, the first stop on his final international trip as president.
 November 16 – President Obama tours the Acropolis of Athens and the Parthenon, on the second day of his official visit to Greece.
 November 20 – President Obama attends the APEC economic summit in Lima, Peru.
 November 26 – President Obama releases a statement on the death of Fidel Castro saying in part, "History will record and judge the enormous impact of this singular figure on the people and world around him. "

December
 December 2 – President Obama holds a bilateral meeting with Secretary-General-designate António Guterres of the United Nations.
 December 6 – President Obama gives his last national security speech at MacDill Air Force Base in Florida. In the speech, the President says that the danger of terrorism is a long-term issue, saying "the threat will endure".
 December 7 – President Obama notes the 75th anniversary of the World War II Pearl Harbor Attack.
 December 14 – President Obama signs the 21st Century Cures Act, a bipartisan bill to expand funding for medical research.
 December 15 – President Obama signs the Better Online Ticket Sales (BOTS) Act of 2016, which makes it illegal to use a bot to purchase tickets online.
 December 16 – President Obama holds his final press conference of 2016.
 December 16 – President Obama and his family travel to Hawaii on Air Force One for their annual holiday vacation.
 December 23 – President Obama signs into law the annual defense spending bill which would increase military pay and require all new recruits to be issued athletic shoes made in the United States.
 December 27 – President Obama visits the USS Arizona Memorial with Japanese Prime Minister Shinzō Abe to honor the 2,403 Americans who died on December 7, 1941.

January 2017 

 January 2 – President Obama returns to the White House after his annual Hawaiian vacation.
 January 3 – The 115th United States Congress convenes with the Republican Party retaining their majorities in the House of Representatives and the Senate.
 January 3 – Paul Ryan is re-elected as Speaker of the United States House of Representatives.
 January 4 – President Obama visits Democratic lawmakers on Capitol Hill with a message to save the Patient Protection and Affordable Care Act, as Republicans prepare to repeal and replace the regulatory overhaul of the U.S. healthcare system. Obama gives his farewell address to the armed forces at Joint Base Myer–Henderson Hall in Arlington, Virginia.
 January 6 – In a joint session of the United States Congress, the results for the electoral college are counted. In his role as President of the Senate, Vice President Joe Biden reads the results and declares President-elect Donald Trump as the winner of the 2016 presidential election. President Obama hosts a farewell party at the White House with a guest list reportedly including Sarah Jessica Parker, Tyler Perry, Chrissy Teigen, Samuel L. Jackson, Charles Barkley, John Legend, Meryl Streep, George and Amal Clooney, Robert De Niro, Beyoncé and Jay Z, Nick Jonas, Jordin Sparks, David Letterman, Paul McCartney, Kelly Rowland, Olivia Wilde, Jason Sudeikis, Magic Johnson, Tom Hanks, Reverend Al Sharpton, Jerry Seinfeld, Stevie Wonder, Steven Spielberg, and Marc Anthony.
 January 10 – President Obama delivers his farewell speech at McCormick Place in his hometown of Chicago.

 January 12 – President Obama signs an executive order which ends the exemption for Cubans who arrive in the United States without visas. Obama presents Vice President Joe Biden with the Presidential Medal of Freedom.
 January 16 – President Obama welcomes the 2016 World Series champion Chicago Cubs to the White House.
 January 17 – President Obama makes a surprise appearance at the final press briefing given by White House Press Secretary Josh Earnest, praising Earnest for his two and a half years' service. President Obama also issues a pardon to General James Cartwright, involving a case in which Cartwright gave information to reporters regarding the Stuxnet virus used against the Iranian nuclear program. Obama commutes the sentence of Chelsea Manning, who was convicted of giving classified information to WikiLeaks.
 January 18 – President Obama holds the final press conference of his presidency, at the White House's James S. Brady Press Briefing Room.
 January 19 – President Obama commutes the sentences of 330 nonviolent drug offenders, the most acts of clemency ever granted in a single day by any U.S. president.
 January 20 – President Obama completes his two terms in office and leaves the White House for the final time as Commander-in-chief. 
 January 20 – Donald Trump is inaugurated as the 45th president of the United States, at noon EST. Barack Obama, who is now former president, leaves for a vacation in Palm Springs, California to begin his post-presidency.

See also
 Timeline of the Barack Obama presidency (2009–2017)

References

External links
 Miller Center Obama Presidential Timeline

Presidency of Barack Obama
Presidency of Barack Obama
2016
Articles containing video clips
2016 timelines